Jeffery Borden Lyman (born August 21, 1950) is a former American football linebacker who played for the St. Louis Cardinals and Buffalo Bills. He also was a businessman who owned the factory "Jeff Lyman's Sofa Factory".

Early life and education
Jeff Lyman was born on August 21, 1950, in Salt Lake City, Utah. Lyman went to high school at Skyline (Uth). He went to college at BYU. Had had an interception returned for a touchdown in 1971.

Professional career

1972 season
Lyman was drafted in the 4th round (82nd overall) of the 1972 NFL Draft by the St. Louis Cardinals. He played in 2 games with them before being waived. He was then claimed by the Buffalo Bills and appeared in 1 game.

1973 season
In April 1973, Lyman was traded in a multi-player trade to the New England Patriots. He was released in training camp and signed with the Los Angeles Rams but did not make their roster.

Business career
In January 1973, Lyman opened a business called Jeff Lyman's Sofa Factory. He worked with 2 of his brothers (Jack and Steve), who also were players with BYU. The store was located in Provo, Utah.

References

1950 births
Living people
Arizona Cardinals players
Buffalo Bills players
American football linebackers
BYU Cougars football players